Bulimulus alternatus  is a species of air-breathing land snail, a pulmonate gastropod mollusk in the family Bulimulidae.

Subspecies 
Subspecies include:
 Bulimulus alternatus mariae (Albers, 1850)

References

Bulimulus
Gastropods described in 1830